This World Made Itself; Myth and Infrastructure; Dreaming of Lucid Living is a 2014 animated film by artist Miwa Matreyek. Matreyek combined three of her multimedia solo live performance pieces, mixed them with recorded music and projected animation including  her body and different shapes like traversing ocean scapes, cityscapes, and dreamscapes. The film had its premiere at the 2014 Sundance Film Festival on January 19, 2014.

The film later shown at Baltimore Theatre Project from March 16 to March 18, 2014.

Production
Talking about the film, Matreyek said that "From early on, I was interested in breaking down the languages of theater, performance and cinema, and I liked playing with the structure of video." She further added that "When you combine the body with video and music, it can create a feeling that defies the physics and gravity of the real world; the body becomes a bit more ephemeral and the animation can then become more tangible and have a weight to it."

Setting
Matreyek projected her own body doing domestic chores at home and with animation and projection transports to different scapes of universe.

References

External links
 Sundance Page

2014 films
2014 animated films
2010s American animated films
2010s English-language films